Francisco Javier Flores Gómez (born 19 April 1982), known as Chechu, is a Spanish professional footballer who plays as a midfielder for Callosa Deportiva CF.

Club career
Chechu was born in Jaén, Andalusia. He spent ten seasons with Girona FC, helping the club to promote from Tercera División to Segunda División during his spell. 

After leaving the Estadi Montilivi at the age of 29, Chechu returned to the Segunda División B and all but remained there the next decade, with CD Tenerife, Hércules CF and Orihuela CF; the exception to this was the 2013–14 campaign, where he played with the first of these teams.

References

External links

1982 births
Living people
Spanish footballers
Footballers from Jaén, Spain
Association football midfielders
Segunda División players
Segunda División B players
Tercera División players
Tercera Federación players
Divisiones Regionales de Fútbol players
Girona FC players
CD Tenerife players
Hércules CF players
Orihuela CF players